Gino Gradkowski (born November 5, 1988) is a former American football center. He played college football at the University of Delaware. He was drafted by the Baltimore Ravens in the fourth round of the 2012 NFL Draft.

College career
Gradkowski played college football as a guard and a center. He began his career playing for West Virginia University. He later transferred to the University of Delaware. He started all fifteen games as a junior.

Professional career

Baltimore Ravens
Gradkowski was drafted in the 4th round (98th overall) of the 2012 NFL Draft by the Baltimore Ravens. In his first season with the team, the Ravens won Super Bowl XLVII. The game's MVP was Joe Flacco, who was also a transfer to the Delaware Blue Hens. With the retirement of Matt Birk following the 2012 season, Gradkowski became the starting center for the Ravens.

Denver Broncos
Gradkowski was traded to the Denver Broncos on April 1, 2015, for draft picks. He was waived by the Broncos on September 6.

Atlanta Falcons
Gradkowski was picked up off waivers by the Atlanta Falcons on September 7, 2015.

Carolina Panthers
On March 10, 2016, Gradkowski signed a three-year, $3.15 million free agent contract with the Carolina Panthers. He also received a $400,000 signing bonus with $450,000 guaranteed. With Pro Bowler Ryan Kalil starting at center, Gradkowski would act as the backup center and guard. When Kalil left with a shoulder injury in Week 11, Gradkowski became the starting center the next week before suffering a knee injury later that game. Both Gradkowski and Kalil were placed on injured reserve on November 29, 2016.

On September 2, 2017, Gradkowski was placed on injured reserve. He was released on September 8, 2017.

New York Jets
On August 15, 2018, Gradkowski signed with the New York Jets. He was released on August 31, 2018.

Denver Broncos (second stint)
On November 12, 2018, Gradkowski signed with the Denver Broncos following an injury to Matt Paradis.

Personal life
Gradkowski is the younger brother of former NFL quarterback Bruce Gradkowski.

References

External links
Delaware Blue Hens bio
Baltimore Ravens bio
Denver Broncos bio
Atlanta Falcons bio

1988 births
Living people
American football centers
American football offensive guards
American people of Italian descent
American people of Polish descent
Atlanta Falcons players
Baltimore Ravens players
Carolina Panthers players
Delaware Fightin' Blue Hens football players
Denver Broncos players
New York Jets players
Players of American football from Pittsburgh
West Virginia Mountaineers football players